Coelus gracilis is a species of beetle in family Tenebrionidae. It is endemic to the United States.

References

Sources

Endemic fauna of the United States
Tenebrionidae
Taxonomy articles created by Polbot
Beetles described in 1939